Kamano Rural LLG may refer to either of the following local-level governments of Papua New Guinea.

Kamano No. 1 Rural LLG, Papua New Guinea
Kamano No. 2 Rural LLG, Papua New Guinea

Local-level governments of Eastern Highlands Province